The Karluk Yabghu State was a polity ruled by Karluk tribes.

History 
The Karluks were part of the First Turkic and Uyghur khaganates. They were composed of three tribes, therefore their ruler mostly called Sanxing Yabghu in 8th century. In 742, they were named "Right Yabghu" by Basmyl khagan Ashina Shi. Like Basmyls, they were ruled by a branch of Ashina tribe.

Karluk chief Bilge Yabghu Tun Apa Yigen Chor submitted to Uyghur khaganate in 746. He may be same person as Yigen Chor (𐰘𐰃𐰏𐰤𐰲𐰆𐰺) mentioned in Kul-Chor stele.

He was succeeded by Tun Bilge Yabghu in 753. A ruler of Karluks were mentioned in Turco-Manichean book "Sacred book of two fundamentals" (Iki Jïltïz Nom), fragments of which were found in 1907 at Kara-Khoja in the Turpan oasis by Albert von Le Coq. The book was dedicated to the ruler of the Chigil tribes, named Alp Burguchan, Alp Tarhan, Alp İl Tirgüg. He probably was the one who conquered Turgesh state and resettled Karluks in Zhetysu basin, making Suyab their capital.

Another ruler was Köbäk, whose coins were found in modern Kyrgyzstan.

Transition to Karakhanids 
When the Yenisei Kyrgyz destroyed the Uyghur Khaganate in 840, Karluk yabghu declared himself khagan with title Bilge Kul Qadir Khan.

See also
Oghuz Yabgu State
List of Turkic dynasties and countries
Turkic peoples
Timeline of Turks (500-1300)

References

Further reading 
 History of civilisations of Central Asia. South Asia Books. March 1999. p. 569. .
 The Cambridge History of Early Inner Asia (Vol 1). Cambridge University Press. p. 532. .

Former countries in Chinese history
Kyrgyzstan
Nomadic groups in Eurasia
756 establishments